Grabber may refer to:

 Frame grabber, an electronic device
 Gibson Grabber, a bass guitar
 Grabber arm, a handheld tool
 Grabbers, a monster film
 Jane the Grabber, an American underground figure